Woodruff is an unincorporated community in Oneida County in the U.S. state of Idaho.

History
The first settlement at Woodruff was made in 1865. A post office called Woodruff was established in 1894, and remained in operation until 1909. The community was named in honor of Wilford Woodruff, 4th President of The Church of Jesus Christ of Latter-day Saints.

References

External links

Unincorporated communities in Oneida County, Idaho
Unincorporated communities in Idaho